The First Sampurnanand ministry is the Council of Ministers in 1st Uttar Pradesh Legislative Assembly headed by Chief Minister Sampurnanand from 1954 to 1957.

Chief Minister & Cabinet Ministers 
 Sampurnanand  - Chief Minister, General Administration, Home
 Hafiz Mohd Ibrahim - Finance, Power, Forest, Cooperatives
 Hukum Singh Bisen - Agriculture and relief, Rehabilitation
 Girdhari Lal - Excise, Registration
 Chandra Bhanu Gupta - Planning, Health, Industries, Civil Supplies
 Charan Singh - Revenue, Transport
 Syed Ali Zahir - Law, Self-governance
 Hargovind Singh - Education, Harijan Assitance
 Kamalapati Tripathi - Information, Irrigation
 Vichitra Narayan Sharma - Public Works
 Acharya Jugal Kishore - Labour, Social Welfare

Deputy Ministers 
 Mangla Prasad - Cooperatives
 Jagmohan Singh Negi - Forest
 Jagan Prasad Rawat - Police
 Muzaffar Hasan - Prison
 Chaturbhuj Sharma - Revenue
 Ram Murti - Irrigation
 Phool Singh - Planning
 Sita Ram - Education
 kailash Prakash - Self-governance
 Lakshmi Raman Acharya - Public Works

Parliamentary Secretaries 
 Kripa Shankar - Attached with Chief Minister
 Banarsi Das - Planning, Health, Industries and Civil Supplies Minister
 Baldev Singh Arya - Planning, Health, Industries and Civil Supplies Minister
 Mohd Rauf Jafri - Attached With Agriculture and relief, Rehabilitation Minister
 Dharm Singh - Attached With Finance, Power, Forest and Cooperatives Minister
 Lakshmi Shankar Yadav -  Attached With Information and Irrigation Minister

See also
 Second Sampurnanand ministry
 First Chandrabhanu Gupta ministry
 Second Chandrabhanu Gupta ministry

References

Sampurnanand
Indian National Congress state ministries
1954 establishments in Uttar Pradesh
Cabinets established in 1954